Howard Hunt Pattee (born October 5, 1926) is an American biologist, Professor Emeritus at Binghamton University and Fellow of the American Association for the Advancement of Science. He graduated at Stanford University in 1948 and completed a Ph.D. there in 1953.

Academics
Professor Pattee's main research interests are theoretical biology with a focus on origin of life, artificial life, biosemiotics, semiotic control of dynamic systems, and the physics of codes and symbols. His many contributions to the "symbol-matter" problem within the cell have had much influence on theoretical biology, biosemiotics, complex systems and artificial life. Books by other authors that have built upon his work include The Consciousness Instinct by Michael Gazzaniga and Behavior and Culture in One Dimension: Sequences, Affordances, and the Evolution of Complexity by his former Ph.D. student Dennis P. Waters.

Eponymous species
 In 2019, a lichen species new to science, Catillaria patteeana, was named for Dr. Pattee.<ref>{{cite journal|last1=Waters|first1=Dennis P.|last2=Lendemer|first2=James C.|title= The Lichens and Allied Fungi of Mercer County, New Jersey  |url=http://sweetgum.nybg.org/images3/3245/782/op18p3_15March2019.pdf |journal= Opuscula Philolichenum |volume=18|year=2019|pages=17–51}}</ref>

References

Publications
 Bibliography
 Downloadable papers
 Howard H. Pattee. Hierarchy theory: the challenge of complex systems. G. Braziller, 1973.
 Howard H. Pattee and Joanna Rączaszek-Leonardi. Laws, Language and Life: Howard Pattee’s classic papers on the physics of symbols with contemporary commentary. Springer, 2012. doi:10.1007/978-94-007-5161-3.
 Howard H. Pattee; Kalevi Kull 2009. A biosemiotic conversation: Between physics and semiotics. Sign Systems Studies'' 37(1/2): 311–331.

External links 
 Google Scholar

1926 births
Living people
Binghamton University faculty
Researchers of artificial life